Cheadle Royal Hospital is a psychiatric hospital in Heald Green, Greater Manchester, England, built between 1848 and 1849. The main building is Grade II listed.

History
The hospital was founded at a time when only two other similar institutions existed in England (Bethlem and St Luke's) and was initially located next to the Manchester Infirmary in 1763. It was designed by Richard Lane in the Elizabethan style and it opened as the Manchester Lunatic Hospital in 1766. It had 24 beds when it opened but it had over 100 patients by 1800.

The facility relocated to Cheadle, ten miles to the south, as the Manchester Royal Hospital for the Insane, in 1849. Voluntary patients, known as boarders, were admitted from 1863. The hospital expanded through the construction of villas on the Cheadle site in the 1860s and through the acquisition of houses in Colwyn Bay in the 1870s. The site in Cheadle was initially 37 acres; in the following 80 years about 220 acres were added and the original part of the site subsequently became formal gardens and sport and recreation grounds. A convalescent hospital at Glan-y-Don, Colwyn Bay, was also established.

The facility became Cheadle Royal Hospital in 1902 and North House, with accommodation for 80 additional patients, was opened in 1903. It had provision for the treatment of 400 patients in 1928 but it chose to remain private rather than joining the National Health Service in 1948. The hospital was acquired by its management team in 1997 and then by Priory Group in 2010.

Famous patients
Famous patients have included:
Johnny Briggs, cricketer
Margot Bryant, actress
Arthur Ransome, children's writer and journalist

See also

 Listed buildings in Cheadle and Gatley
 Healthcare in Greater Manchester
 List of hospitals in England

References

Further reading
Nesta Roberts, Cheadle Royal Hospital: A bicentenary history (1967)

External links
 The Priory Hospital Cheadle Royal

Buildings and structures completed in 1765
Hospital buildings completed in the 18th century
Hospital buildings completed in 1849
Psychiatric hospitals in England
Hospitals in Greater Manchester
Hospitals established in the 1760s
1763 establishments in Great Britain
Cheadle, Greater Manchester
Private hospitals in the United Kingdom